Kabhi Socha Na Tha is a 2017 Pakistani drama serial directed by Abdullah Badini, produced by SBCH Productions and written by  Misbah Nosheen. The drama stars Anum Fayyaz, Iffat Rahim, Omer Farooq and Babar Ali. It first aired 5 July 2017 on Geo Entertainment. It is a story based on doubts that ruin relationships and homes. Nosheen crafted an insecure woman who creates scenarios, possessiveness and doubt. The serial marks the small screen debut of Sara Bhatti.

Cast
Omer Farooq
Iffat Rahim
Anum Fayyaz
Babar Ali
Zainab Jameel
Sara Bhatti
Rabia Noreen
Shehryar Zaidi
Yasir Mazhar
Fahad Khan

References

Pakistani drama television series
Geo TV original programming
Urdu-language television shows